Guraleus colmani is a species of sea snail, a marine gastropod mollusk in the family Mangeliidae.

Description

Distribution
This marine species is endemic to Australia and can be found off the Northern Territory.

References

 Shuto, T. "New turrid taxa from the Australian waters." Mem. Fac. Sci. Kyushu Univ. Serie D Geol 25 (1983): 16.

External links
  Tucker, J.K. 2004 Catalog of recent and fossil turrids (Mollusca: Gastropoda). Zootaxa 682:1–1295.

colmani
Gastropods described in 1983
Gastropods of Australia